Chad Wackerman (born March 25, 1960) is an American jazz, jazz fusion and rock drummer, who has played with Frank Zappa and Allan Holdsworth. He has worked as a band member, session musician, sideman, and leader of his own ensembles. He is the older brother of drummers John Wackerman and Brooks Wackerman.

Musical career
Wackerman was raised in Seal Beach, California, in a family immersed in music. His father Chuck Wackerman, a drummer, is a music teacher who has taught at both high school and middle school levels with a specialization in jazz. Chad and his brothers John and Brooks are all proficient drummers and multi-instrumentalists. John recorded an album titled Drum Duets Vol.1.

Wackerman joined the Bill Watrous band in 1978, and then worked with Frank Zappa from 1981 to 1988. Zappa demanded high musical standards and imposed exacting discipline in rehearsal and on tour. The auditions for his band were "grueling", according to Steve Vai and Wackerman himself.
Two pieces of music, "Mo 'n Herb's Vacation", and "The Black Page"  were considered exceptionally difficult. Only three drummers throughout Zappa's career were able to play them successfully: Wackerman, Terry Bozzio, and Vinnie Colaiuta.  In an interview with Drum Magazine, Bozzio noted that although he and Colaiuta gained more notoriety from playing with Zappa, Wackerman performed Zappa's most challenging material.

In addition to appearing on Zappa's rock albums and tours, Wackerman performed with the London Symphony Orchestra in 1983 on a concert and recording session of Zappa's compositions.

Sideman and session musician

In 1985, Wackerman toured with, but did not record for, Australian rock act Men at Work. He played on the album and supporting video One Voice with Barbra Streisand. He has also recorded albums and toured with diverse artists such as Allan Holdsworth, Steve Vai, Andy Summers, Ed Mann, Albert Lee, Colin Hay, Ed Kuepper, Dweezil Zappa and Tom Grant. Wackerman was also the drummer for the house band on the first Dennis Miller late night talk show.

Wackerman has also toured with James Taylor, Mark Linn-Baker and Larry Sweeney, John Patitucci, Jeff Lorber, and Joe Sample, as well as fellow Zappa drummer Terry Bozzio in a series of all-percussion concerts. Wackerman lived in Australia for ten years between 1995 and 2005, but moved back to California in July 2005.

Replacing drummer Marco Minnemann, Wackerman toured with Steven Wilson's band through 2013 in support of Wilson's album The Raven That Refused to Sing.

Chad Wackerman Trio
The current Chad Wackerman Trio consists of Wackerman (drums), Doug Lunn (1954–2017; bass), and Mike Miller (guitar). Wackerman's solo albums include guitar contributions from Allan Holdsworth.

Discography
 Forty Reasons (1991)
 The View (1993)
 Scream (2000)
 Legs Eleven (2004)
 Dreams Nightmares and Improvisations (2012)

References

External links

Yamaha Australia page
Drummerworld page
[ Allmusic]

1960 births
American jazz drummers
Musicians from Long Beach, California
Living people
American session musicians
Men at Work members
20th-century American drummers
American male drummers
American male jazz musicians
Favored Nations artists
Jazz musicians from California